Felix Bernstein (24 February 1878 in Halle, Germany – 3 December 1956 in Zürich, Switzerland), was a German Jewish mathematician known for proving  in 1896 the Schröder–Bernstein theorem, a central result in set theory, and less well known for demonstrating in 1924 the correct blood group inheritance pattern of multiple alleles at one locus  through statistical analysis.

Life
Felix Bernstein was born in 1878 to a Jewish family of academics. His father Julius held the Chair of Physiology at the Martin Luther University of Halle-Wittenberg, and was the Director of the Physiological Institute at the University of Halle.

While still in gymnasium in Halle, Bernstein heard the university seminar of Georg Cantor, who was a friend of Bernstein's father.
From 1896 to 1900, Bernstein studied in Munich, Halle, Berlin and Göttingen.
In the early Weimar Republic, Bernstein temporarily was Göttingen vice-chairman of the local chapter of German Democratic Party .
In 1933,
after Hitler's rise to power, Bernstein was removed from his chair, per §6 of the Nazi Law for the Restoration of the Professional Civil Service, often used against politically unpopular persons.
He received the message of his dismissal during a research/lecturing journey (started on Dec. 1st, 1932) to the United States, and he stayed there. He was a visiting professor of mathematics at Columbia University from 1933 to 1936 and a professor of biometry at New York University from 1936 to 1943. In 1942 he was elected a fellow of the American Association for the Advancement of Science. In 1948, Bernstein retired from teaching in the US, and returned to Europe.
He mainly lived in Rome and Freiburg, occasionally visiting Göttingen, where he became professor emeritus.
He died of cancer in Zurich on 3 December 1956.

Publications
 
  (Dissertation, 1901); reprint Jan 2010, 
 
 
 
 
 
 
 
  — Corrections in Vol.29 (1920), p. 94

Notes

See also
Cantor–Bernstein theorem
Schröder–Bernstein property

References

External links 
 Biography at the Felix-Bernstein-Institute for Mathematical Statistics in the Biosciences at the Göttingen University
 

1878 births
1956 deaths
19th-century German mathematicians
20th-century German mathematicians
People from Halle (Saale)
People from the Province of Saxony
19th-century German Jews
Set theorists
University of Göttingen alumni
Fellows of the American Association for the Advancement of Science
Emigrants from Nazi Germany to the United States